Nasirabad-e Sofla (also Romanized as Naşīrābād-e Soflá) is a village in Charuymaq-e Shomalesharqi Rural District of the Central District of Hashtrud County, East Azerbaijan province, Iran. At the 2006 National Census, its population was 730 in 154 households. The following census in 2011 counted 702 people in 193 households. The latest census in 2016 showed a population of 542 people in 195 households; it was the largest village in its rural district.

References 

Hashtrud County

Populated places in East Azerbaijan Province

Populated places in Hashtrud County